Sisam is the Ottoman Turkish name for the island of Samos, Greece.

Sisam may also refer to:
Ainu word for a Japanese person
Sisam hypothesis on royal genealogies
Syresham, UK village from which the English name Sisam is derived

People with the surname Sisam
Charles Herschel Sisam (1879–1964), an American mathematician
Kenneth Sisam (1887-1971), a New Zealand academic and publisher